Evick Knob is a summit in West Virginia, in the United States.

Evick Knob has the name of Christian Evick, an early settler.

References

Mountains of Pendleton County, West Virginia
Mountains of West Virginia